Thalassia is a marine seagrass genus comprising two known species.

Species
Thalassia hemprichii  (Ehrenb.) Asch. - Pacific Turtlegrass (shores of the Western and Central Indo-Pacific)
Thalassia testudinum (Banks ex K.D.König) - Caribbean Turtlegrass (Gulf of Mexico, Caribbean Sea, and Bermuda)

References

External links

Images of Thalassia at Algaebase

Hydrocharitaceae
Seagrass
Hydrocharitaceae genera
Taxa named by Joseph Banks
Taxa named by Charles Konig